Pietro Antonio Rotari (30 September 1707 – 31 August 1762) was an Italian painter of the Baroque period. Born in Verona, he led a peripatetic career, and died in Saint Petersburg, where he had traveled to paint for the Russian court. His portraits, mostly of women, are renowned for being beautiful and realistic. Rotari's works were generally limited to royal portraits held by notables such as emperors and court ladies.

Biography
He was initially a pupil of Antonio Balestra, but moved and lived in Venice from 1725 to 1727. He then joined the studio of Francesco Trevisani in Rome (1728–1732). Between 1731 and 1734, he worked with Francesco Solimena in Naples. He then returned then to Verona, where he started a studio. In 1750, he had moved to Vienna. In 1756, he was invited to Russia by the court of the Tsarina Elizabetta Petrovna. From there he moved to Dresden and to work with the court of Augustus III of Poland. He returned to St Petersburg to work with the court of Catherine II.

He was much in demand as a portraitist, and painted royal families in Dresden and Saint Petersburg. He also painted the multi-figured altarpieces of the Four Martyrs (1745) for the church of the Ospedale di San Giacomo in Verona. He also painted an altarpiece of San Giorgio tempted to sacricifice to the Idols (1743) for the church of the same name in Reggio-Emilia, and an Annunciation (1738) for the main altar for the church of the Annunziata in Guastalla.

References
Notes

Sources

External links

Artcyclopedia:Pietro Rotari

1707 births
1762 deaths
Painters from Verona
18th-century Italian painters
Italian male painters
Italian Baroque painters
18th-century Italian male artists